Godfrey Gao (22 September 1984 – 27 November 2019) was a Taiwanese-Canadian model and actor. Described as Asia's first male supermodel, Gao was the first male Asian model to appear in a campaign for Louis Vuitton. As an actor, he was known for his roles as Magnus Bane in the 2013 film adaptation of  The Mortal Instruments: City of Bones, and for his leading role in the Chinese television series Remembering Lichuan.

Early life
Gao was born Tsao Chih-hsiang in Taipei on 22 September 1984. Gao's father is a Taiwanese of Shanghainese descent, and worked as a general manager at Michelin Taiwan; his mother is a Malaysian of Peranakan Chinese descent from George Town who won the Miss Penang beauty pageant in 1970. The youngest of three boys, Gao was moved with his brothers to North Vancouver, British Columbia, Canada, where his parents raised their boys during his childhood. He attended Queensbury Elementary School and Argyle Secondary School, and later studied at Capilano University where the 6'4" Gao played basketball for the school's team.

Career
Gao returned to Taiwan to work as a model in 2004, and was managed by JetStar Entertainment. Gao and fellow male models Sphinx Ting, Victor Chen, and Lan Chun-tien were collectively nicknamed the "Fashion 4" (F4), and jointly released a book in 2009. In 2011, he became the first Asian model for the fashion brand Louis Vuitton.

Gao began appearing in minor roles in Chinese television dramas in 2006, and had his first starring role in the 2010 television drama Volleyball Lover. In 2013, he made his American film debut as Magnus Bane in the film adaption of The Mortal Instruments: City of Bones. His starring role in the 2016 drama Remembering Lichuan (alongside Jiao Junyan, and others) was widely acclaimed, and earned him the nickname of the "nation's husband" in Chinese media. Gao's other notable credits include the 2015 film Wedding Bible alongside Korean actress Yoo In-na, and the 2017 romantic comedy film Love is a Broadway Hit, alongside Wang Likun, Wang Chuanjun, Yuan Li and Naren Weiss.

Death 
On 27 November 2019 at about 1:45 am China Standard Time, Gao collapsed in Ningbo while filming Chase Me, a sports reality television series broadcast on Zhejiang Television. He was taken to a hospital, where after attempts at resuscitation for nearly three hours, he was pronounced dead. Gao's death was confirmed in a statement on the social media site Sina Weibo by his agency JetStar Entertainment that stated, "We are very shocked and saddened and even until now find it impossible to accept."

The producers of Chase Me said in a statement that Gao died from cardiac arrest. Gao's death prompted increased scrutiny of the series, which involves contestants competing in physically strenuous challenges late at night, and of the safety standards of Chinese reality television productions more broadly. Gao had reportedly been filming for 17 hours at the time of his collapse; actor and director Xu Zheng stated that the series' producers "must be held responsible" for what he claimed were poor health and safety conditions. In a statement on Sina Weibo, Zhejiang Television stated that they were "deeply regretful and sorry for the irreparable and serious consequences that this incident has caused, and are willing to take up responsibility."

Gao's body was moved to a funeral home in Ningbo on 28 November 2019, and returned to Taiwan on 2 December 2019. Gao's funeral, a Buddhist ceremony per the request of Gao's mother, was held in Taiwan on 15 December 2019. His remains are interred at Chin Pao San.

Filmography

Film

Television series

Awards

|-
| 2017
| The Jade Pendant 
|  Most Popular Actor
| Golden Angel Awards
| 
|
| 
|-

Notes

References

External links
 Official website (defunct, retrieved via Archive)
 

1984 births
2019 deaths
21st-century Taiwanese male actors
21st-century Canadian male actors
Canadian male actors of Taiwanese descent
Canadian male actors of Chinese descent
Canadian male film actors
Canadian male models
Canadian male television actors
Capilano University alumni
Male actors from Taipei
Male actors from Vancouver
Taiwanese emigrants to Canada
Taiwanese male film actors
Taiwanese male television actors
Taiwanese male models
Articles with hCards